General elections were held in Kenya on Tuesday, 9 August 2022. Voters elected the president, governors, senators, members of the National Assembly, and members of county assemblies. 

This was the third general election and the fourth presidential one since the promulgation of the 2010 constitution. Incumbent president Uhuru Kenyatta was not eligible for a third term according to the constitution, nor county governors who had served two terms. The 2022 general election saw the lowest number of presidential candidates cleared since the multi-party system was implemented in 1992. Parliamentarians were elected to sit in the 13th Parliament of Kenya.

William Ruto was elected President of Kenya with 50.5% of the vote, defeating Raila Odinga who received 48.85% of the vote. On 22 August, Odinga filed a petition with the Supreme Court of Kenya challenging the results announced by Wafula Chebukati, the chairman of the Independent Electoral and Boundaries Commission. On 5 September, the Supreme Court rejected the challenge and upheld Ruto's victory. Observers had described the elections as largely peaceful and transparent. Odinga said he would respect the court verdict, although he still claimed victory.

Background

The Constitution of Kenya requires that a general election of members of parliament be held on the second Tuesday of August on every fifth year, which meant that the general election was scheduled for 9 August 2022. If Kenya is at war, the election can be delayed if a resolution is passed in each House of Parliament by at least two-thirds of all the members of the House. Such a resolution can delay the election by up to six months, and may be passed multiple times provided that the delays do not cumulatively exceed 12 months.

The constitution requires that a presidential election take place at the same time as the general election. In the event that prior to the next general election the position of president falls vacant and the office of deputy president is also vacant (who otherwise would assume the office of president), a presidential election could be held at an earlier date. According to the constitution, in such circumstances, an election needs to be held within sixty days after the vacancy arose in the office of president.

Incumbent president Uhuru Kenyatta was not eligible to pursue a third term due to the two-term limit in the constitution. County governors who had served two terms at the helms of their respective counties were also ineligible for a third term.

Electoral system

The President of Kenya is elected using a modified version of the two-round system: to win in the first round, a candidate must receive over 50% of the vote nationally and 25% of the vote in at least 24 of Kenya's 47 counties. If no candidate achieves this, a second round is held between the top two candidates, in which the candidate with the most votes wins.

The Parliament of Kenya consists of two houses: the Senate (upper house) and the National Assembly (lower house), both of which were fully renewed for five-year terms. Those elected in 2022 formed the 13th Parliament of Kenya.

The National Assembly has 350 members, of which 290 are elected in single-member constituencies by first-past-the-post voting. Of the remaining 60, 47 are reserved for women and are elected from single-member constituencies based on the 47 counties, also using the first-past-the-post system. The remaining 13 seats include 12 nominated by political parties based on their number of seats and a Speaker, elected by the assembly from outside of it as an ex officio member. The nominated members are reserved for youths, persons with disabilities and workers.

The 68 members of the Senate are elected by four methods; 47 are elected in single-member constituencies based on the counties by first-past-the-post voting. Parties are then assigned a share of 16 seats for women, two for youth and two for persons with disabilities based on their seat share. A speaker is also elected as an ex officio member.

Presidential candidates

Only four presidential aspirants and their running mates from parties were cleared. Walter Mong'are's nomination to run for presidency was revoked, after it emerged his degree was not from a recognized university as required by law. The final list of presidential candidates was;

 David Waihiga Mwaure, leader of the Agano Party 
 Raila Odinga, former Prime Minister of Kenya (2008–2013) and leader of the Orange Democratic Movement, under Azimio la Umoja One Kenya Alliance. He was a presidential candidate in 1997, as well as the runner-up in 2007, 2013, and 2017.
 William Ruto, Deputy President of Kenya (2013–2022) and leader of the United Democratic Alliance,  under Kenya Kwanza Alliance party
 George Wajackoyah, leader of the Roots Party Kenya

Campaign

Leading up to the 2022 election, a new political dynamic based on class politics was emerging in Kenya, framed as "hustlers" versus "dynasties". The families of incumbent President Uhuru Kenyatta and opposition leader Raila Odinga had dominated Kenyan politics since independence in 1963. Moreover, Kenya has traditionally been ruled by presidents who belong to either the Kikuyu people – like Kenyatta – or the Kalenjin people, like William Ruto. The potential victory of Odinga, a Luo, would mark a departure for the country, which has 44 ethnic groups.

Ruto initially supported Odinga in the 2007 election against Mwai Kibaki. The announcement of the presidential results led to ethnic clashes among Kenya's tribes. Police crackdowns on protesters and clashes that turned into ethnic attacks killed more than 1,000 people in post-election violence, eventually prompting a new constitution to devolve power. Ruto aligned himself with Kenyatta in 2013. Both Kenyatta and Ruto had been indicted by the International Criminal Court (ICC) on crimes against humanity charges for their alleged role in orchestrating the post-election violence in the 2007 election. The cases later collapsed, with former ICC chief prosecutor Fatou Bensouda saying a relentless campaign of victim and witness intimidation made the trial impossible.

In March 2018, President Kenyatta and his former rival for the presidency, Odinga, stunned the public when they shook hands and declared a truce after post-election violence in 2017 left dozens of people dead. The two leaders also sought to expand the executive through the Building Bridges Initiative (BBI) constitutional changes, which would have potentially allowed Kenyatta to stay in power as a prime minister. But despite the Supreme Court of Kenya ruling against the proposed amendments in August, the unexpected alliance has persevered, with Odinga attending official government functions with Kenyatta. Cracks within the Jubilee government began to appear, leading to an eventual fallout between Kenyatta and his deputy, Ruto.

Presidential nomination
In December 2021, the Mount Kenya Foundation, one of the country's most powerful and wealthy Kikuyu lobbies, announced their support for Odinga, while Kenyatta has repeatedly said that the next president will be "neither Kikuyu nor Kalenjin". On 10 December 2021, Odinga declared his intention to run for the presidency for the fifth time.

In January 2022, Ruto's United Democratic Alliance (UDA) announced a coalition pact with the Amani National Congress, FORD–Kenya and several other political parties. The new coalition was called Kenya Kwanza.

In February 2022, Kenyatta's Jubilee party announced that it would join the Azimio la Umoja coalition headed by Odinga, the leader of the Orange Democratic Movement (ODM). On 12 March 2022, at least 26 political parties, including major political parties Jubilee, Wiper, ODM and KANU, signed a co-operation pact endorsing Raila Odinga's presidential candidature. That same day, Kenyatta publicly endorsed Odinga for the presidency.

On 15 March 2022, the UDA and Kenya Kwanza endorsed Ruto as their presidential candidate.

Deputy presidential nomination
Several individuals showed interest in the position of deputy president. Azimio la Umoja held interviews for 10 prospective running mates, namely: Kalonzo Musyoka, Martha Karua, Peter Munya, Sabina Chege, Peter Kenneth, Stephen Kipkiyeny Tarus, Ali Hassan Joho, Wycliffe Oparanya, Lee Kinyanjui and Charity Ngilu.  Musyoka, Odinga's two-time running mate, threatened to skip the interviews, but ultimately appeared for an interview on 10 May 2022.  In the Kenya Kwanza camp, several names were rumoured to be possible running mates, namely: Rigathi Gachagua, Kindiki Kithure, Anne Waiguru, Ndindi Nyoro, Justin Muturi and Musalia Mudavadi.

In April 2022, Roots Party candidate George Wajackoyah named Justina Wamae, a former candidate for Parliament from Mavoko Constituency, as his running mate. On 15 May 2022, Kenya Kwanza endorsed Rigathi Gachagua as Ruto's running mate. Azimio la Umoja selected Martha Karua as Odinga's running mate on 16 May 2022. The Agano Party's Waihiga Mwaure selected Ruth Mucheru Mutua as his running mate.

Manifestos
Azimio la Umoja was the first political outfit to launch their manifesto on 6 June 2022. The ten point manifesto voiced key issues such as a corruption-free government. The manifesto came in the form of a declaration and promised to strengthen devolution; economically empower women; waste no single child; spur the economic pillar; facilitate climate-smart agriculture; revamp the manufacturing sector; enact responsible leadership; preserve sovereignty of the people; increase access to clean water; create "Baba Care", which would focus on social protection and transformation; and upscale health coverage to universal health care.

Ruto's UDA and Wajackoyah's Roots Party launched their manifestos on 30 June 2022. Ruto, who intended to apply a "bottom-up economic model", presented a manifesto promising to revive the economy, provide healthcare for all, promote micro, small and medium enterprises (MSME), and implement a two-thirds gender rule and affordable housing, among other policies.

Wajackoyah intended to legalise marijuana for commercial purposes, introduce snake farming, export dog meat, shut and bring down the standard-gauge railway, hang the corrupt, suspend the constitution, introduce four-day work week, move capital city to Isiolo, create eight states, and repatriate idle foreigners.

On 4 July 2022, Agano Party presidential candidate David Mwaure Waihiga launched his 12-point manifesto. He argued that it was time for the country to move forward and start on a new slate in terms of leadership. He planned to pledge alliance to the constitution; to family, women, youth, persons living with disability, county governments, workers, business owners, the economy, religious institutions and the environment; as well as to the international community. He also promised to recover public monies stashed in offshore accounts as well as dissolve the Nairobi City County government.

Electoral candidates debates
On 2 March 2022, the Media Council of Kenya, in conjunction with the Media Owners Association and Kenya Editors' Guild, announced plans to conduct presidential debates in July 2022. Clifford Machoka was appointed to organise the presidential and deputy presidential debates. The debates were scheduled to run on 11, 19, and 26 July 2022 at Catholic University of Eastern Africa; and they were to be broadcast live across most television and radio stations, and their online platforms. A Nairobi City County gubernatorial debate was also scheduled amongst the presidential and deputy presidential debates due to it being Kenya's capital. Each of the debates ran in two sessions; the first session involved candidates who stood below 5% in the last three opinion polls, while the second session was between candidates reaching above 5% in the same polls.

On 11 July 2022, the first tier of the Nairobi gubernatorial debate took place and four of the seven candidates expected took the stage, namely: Nancy Mwadime of the Usawa kwa Wote Party, Herman Grewal of Safina, Kenneth Nyamwamu of the United Progressive Alliance and independent candidate Esther Thairu. The second tier of the debate, which aired on primetime, put former Nairobi deputy governor Polycarp Igathe against incumbent senator Sakaja Johnson, though the latter arrived 20 minutes late into the debate. The deputy presidential debate that involved four candidates also aired in two sessions: Wamae faced off against Mucheru. Karua and Gachagua duelled in the second tier. An estimated 34 million Kenyans tuned in for the deputy presidential debate; an estimated 18.7 million of those who followed the debate were registered voters. 70% watched the second tier while 5% viewed the first. The hallmark of the three debates, the presidential debate, was the final one, and it was to have Mwaure go against Wajackoyah first, while Odinga and Ruto face off in the second tier. However, Odinga and Wajackoyah dropped out of the presidential debate. Odinga argued that he could not debate with Ruto, whom he accused of having questionable integrity. Wajackoyah's demand to debate with the two main presidential candidates was not met; though he made his way to the debating venue before storming off. Mwaure and Ruto were featured alone in their respective sessions. In addition to joint presidential debates, individual television stations aired gubernatorial debates from other counties, and a constituency debate.

Campaign season

The campaign season officially kicked off on 29 May 2022 as clearance of electoral candidates continued. Although the presidential election was considered a two-horse race between Odinga and Ruto, Wajackoyah gained significant popularity within the electorate due to his radical measures to quell the ballooning public debt. Ruto's Kenya Kwanza proclaimed themselves 'hustlers', calling Odinga a dynasty and a 'project' of the outgoing government. Odinga's Azimio la Umoja branded Kenya Kwanza as an alliance of the corrupt since most of the leaders in the coalition are suspected, accused, or convicted of corruption and other integrity issues. Odinga billed himself and his running mate Karua as liberators who fought for the multiparty system, campaigned for the new regime in 2002 and were proponents of the 2010 constitutional dispensation. On 28 July 2022, Ruto's running mate Gachagua was ordered by the anti-corruption court to forfeit Ksh 202 million to the state after it was determined the funds were proceeds of corruption.

On 6 August 2022, all candidates across all elective seats held their final campaigns in different parts of the country. Odinga held his last rally at Moi International Sports Centre; Ruto at Nyayo in Nairobi and Kirigiti Stadia in Kiambu County; Wajackoyah and Mwaure in different parts of Nairobi.

Conduct

Mass voter listing
The Independent Electoral and Boundaries Commission (IEBC) announced plans to roll out the first phase of a 30-day mass voter registration exercise beginning 4 October 2021. The exercise targeted between 6 and 7 million new voters. However, with the home stretch of voter registration approaching, the commission raised concerns over its failure to reach its target. On 17 January 2022, the three-week second phase of the mass voter listing targeting 4.5 million voters kicked off, registering low turnout as well. In May 2022, the commission suspended voter registration to March 2023, attributing the move to the auditing and verification processes that may alter with the timelines set ahead of the elections.

Electoral candidates clearance
IEBC registered all aspirants expected to run for the various elective seats between 29 May and 7 June 2022. William Ruto and Raila Odinga were cleared on 4 and 5 June respectively, in an event that would see them present their nomination papers.

In June 2022, reports began to emerge that Sakaja Johnson presented a fake certificate to IEBC from a Ugandan university and that he never graduated from the University of Nairobi (UoN). Initially, Sakaja had stated in interviews that he was an alumnus of UoN, where he purportedly pursued a bachelor's degree in actuarial science. It would later emerge that Sakaja was yet to complete his studies at UoN since his enrollment in 2003. He admitted in a radio interview that he did not graduate from the city's university, accusing Uhuru Kenyatta of plotting to destroy his political ambitions. At the time of clearance, he had presented a Bachelor of Science in Management certificate from Uganda's Team University, where he alleged he was an external student. On 29 June 2022, the Commission for University Education revoked his degree, pending investigations. The IEBC declined to revoke Sakaja's clearance, stating it can only disqualify him candidate if issued with a court order. Uganda's Inspector General ordered a probe into the legislator's degree saga.  On 12 July 2022, the High Court dismissed a petition over Sakaja's degree, faulting the petitioner, Dennis Gakuu Wahome, for failing to discharge the burden of proof that the gubernatorial candidate degree certificate was fake.

Former Nairobi governor Mike Sonko was denied clearance to run for the Mombasa governorship following his impeachment in 2020. Sonko filed a petition at the High Court to have it compel IEBC to clear him for the gubernatorial race. On 13 July 2022, the court noted in its ruling that Sonko's impeachment case was yet to be determined by the Supreme Court, and ordered the electoral commission to clear Sonko to vie for the Mombasa governorship. On 14 July 2022, Sonko presented his nomination papers at IEBC where he was cleared to vie for Mombasa governor. On 15 July 2022, the Supreme Court ruled that Sonko was duly impeached by the county assembly of Nairobi City, which automatically makes Sonko fail the integrity test to occupy any elective or appointed office. Following the court's decision, IEBC revoked his clearance.

IEBC preparation for general election
By the end of clearance, IBEC gazetted a total of 16,098 candidates contesting 1,882 elective slots. IEBC received the first batch of ballot papers on 7 July 2022. The ballot papers were printed by a Greek firm known as Inform P Lykos, situated in Athens, which was awarded the tender worth Ksh 3 billion. The Kenya Integrated Election Management System (KIEMS) was used as the primary mode of voter verification, with the manual register used as a supplementary when these KIEMS kits fail. This led to a vast discussion across the political spectrum on the possibility of KIEMS being subject to manipulation. Some noted that Smartmatic International, the supplier of the digital register, is not short of controversy.

On 21 July 2022, three Venezuelan nationals were intercepted at the Jomo Kenyatta International Airport  with what were believed to be sensitive election materials. IEBC released a statement on their social media platform decrying the detention of Smartmatic International staff. Directorate of Criminal Investigations (DCI) boss George Kinoti released an official statement claiming the two Venezuelan nationals traveled with expired passports, were in possession of 'questionable' material and were on a business trip. The foreigners had stickers that were to be used in the election. IEBC explained that the stickers had information on the polling station, polling centre, ward, constituency and county. On 28 July 2022, following their public spat, DCI and IEBC ended their row, amicably agreeing that the issue with the stickers had been solved.

General elections
On 8 August 2022, IEBC suspended the gubernatorial elections in Kakamega and Mombasa counties, as well as the parliamentary polls for Pokot South, Rongai and Kacheliba constituencies. Chebukati noted that the ballot papers for affected areas had errors, including pictures for candidates and details. Apart from the mentioned counties and constituencies, IEBC also suspended elections in five wards over candidates' deaths. Voters in the affected areas voted on 23 August 2022.

On election day, voting in Eldas Constituency of Wajir County was postponed to 10 August 2022 due to security concerns. This was after the constituency returning officer was hospitalised after being shot in the leg.

The voting exercise was greatly affected by the failure of the KIEMS kits to pick voters' fingerprints. IEBC allowed the use of manual register in parts of Kakamega and Makueni counties after a blight of hitches from the KIEMS kits. Some polling stations opened later than the stipulated time of 6 am, leading to delayed voting.

By midday on election day, 6,567,859 voters, constituting 30% of those registered, had cast their ballots. An hour before the closure of polling centers at 5 pm, the electoral commission reported a voter turnout of 12,065,803, equating to 56.17% of registered voters. On 10 August 2022, IEBC announced that 14 million Kenyans, who were identified electronically, had voted bringing the total percentage to 65.4%.

Didmus Barasa, the Member of Parliament for Kimilili Constituency, had been accused of shooting dead his rival's security guard and fleeing the scene following the event.

Observers described the elections as largely peaceful and transparent.

Interference 
An investigation into a company that has reportedly interfered in elections worked on the 2022 Kenyan election. A strategist working on the campaign of William Ruto claims that his Telegram account had been hacked before the elections, including increased activities. It was revealed that this was done by Tal Hanan, an Israeli businessman who has reportedly interfered in several elections around the world. Hanan also hacked the Telegram and Gmail accounts linked to other advisers working with the Ruto campaign.

While the client behind the hacks has not been revealed, Odinga has acknowledged that he hired white hat hackers, or ethical hackers, to uncover evidence to uncover electoral fraud that saw him lose the election.

Opinion polls

This table below lists polls completed since Raila Odinga announced that he would enter the race.

Graphical summary of opinion polls

Results and reactions

The results had been scheduled to be announced at 3 pm on 15 August 2022, however, by 5 pm no announcement had been made. Four IEBC commissioners, led by vice chair Juliana Cherera, held a press conference stating that they do not "take ownership" of the results, citing issues with the final tallying process. The results were announced at 6 pm by IEBC chairman Wafula Chebukati. All candidates except Raila Odinga appeared at the announcement; Odinga's chief agent Saitabao Ole Kanchory announced that Odinga would not appear until his campaign team could verify the results. As Chebukati and other two commissioners made their way into the Bomas of Kenya auditorium, violence erupted in the venue and the IEBC staff were escorted away. After security personnel resolved the situation, Chebukati made his way to the auditorium and announced the results, naming William Ruto as the president-elect.

The following day, 16 August, the dissident IEBC commissioners, Cherera, Francis Wanderi, Irene Masit and Justus Nyang’aya, gave a more detailed explanation of the division within the commission.  The four stated that the total percentage exceeded 100%, the results were not processed and analysed by all the commissioners, and that Chebukati did not provide the total numbers of registered voters, votes cast, or rejected ballots. They accused Chebukati of announcing results prematurely, before votes from some counties had been incorporated, and accused Chebukati of exceeding his legal role. This was disputed by the Elections Observations Group, a Kenyan NGO, who stated "The commission's verification process was credible and every critical player was involved with that process – from observers, political party agents, media, body officials ... The commission made data publicly available". Chebukati also defended his announcement by stating that the 100.01% result was attributable to a rounding error, and accused the four dissenting commissioners of trying to force a re-run of the election.

Odinga rejected the outcome of the presidential election and announced he would begin a legal challenge. He termed the election a "travesty", "unconstitutional", and "null and void". Odinga also asked for his supporters to refrain from violence. On 22 August, Odinga filed a court challenge to the result. Odinga claimed the election results were based on criminal and fraudulent activities, his party agents were barred access to several election sites, technology was used for fraud, and the fraud was preplanned. Several others filed complaints too, claiming for instance that the results were not included in the tallying and verification of the IEBC chairman from 28 constituencies with at least 8% of the votes.  On 5 September, Kenya's Supreme Court rejected the petitions and upheld Ruto's victory. Observers had described the elections as largely peaceful and transparent. Odinga said he would respect the court verdict, although he still claimed victory.

President

By county

Parliament

National Assembly

Senate

Misinformation on various social media 
there was a fake statement shared on Facebook claiming that two local media houses i.e Royal Media Services and The Standard Group had called the elections in favour of Raila Odinga. According to this fake statement, Raila Odinga was leading the 2022 Presidential elections with 51.13% while William Samoei Ruto was at 48.22%. These claims were denounced by the media houses' senior editors and PesaCheck also confirmed that the statement was fake.

Notes

References

Kenya
General
Kenya
Election and referendum articles with incomplete results
Elections in Kenya
National Assembly (Kenya)
Presidential elections in Kenya